Rolltop may refer to
Rolltop desk
A type of equestrian cross country obstacle